Robert Fred Grottkau (born March 22, 1937) is a former American football guard in the National Football League (NFL) for the Detroit Lions and Dallas Cowboys. He played college football at the University of Oregon.

Early years
Grottkau attended Oakland High School where he played as a fullback. He accepted a scholarship from the University of Oregon. As a sophomore, he was switched to offensive tackle. The next year, he was moved to guard out of necessity and became a two-year starter.

Professional career

Detroit Lions
He was selected by the Detroit Lions in the fourth round (46th overall) of the 1959 NFL Draft. In 1960, he played only 5 games.

On August 21, 1961, he was traded along with rookie Houston Entwine to the Dallas Cowboys in exchange for offensive lineman John Gonzaga.

Dallas Cowboys
In 1961, he was a reserve player. On July 31, 1962, he was waived after being unable to overcome a knee injury.

Personal life
Grottkau was the offensive line coach at San Jose State University for two years. In 1971, he was named the offensive coordinator and line coach for the University of Iowa.

References

1937 births
Living people
American football offensive guards
Dallas Cowboys players
Detroit Lions players
Iowa Hawkeyes football coaches
Oregon Ducks football players
Players of American football from Oakland, California
San Jose State Spartans football coaches
Sportspeople from San Rafael, California